The Second Mahanadi Rail Bridge is a rail bridge over the Mahanadi near Cuttack in the Indian state of Odisha.

The first Mahanadi Rail Bridge was opened on 1 January 1899. The Engineer in Charge of construction of the first Mahanadi Rail Bridge was William Beckett, who won a gold medal from the Institution of Civil Engineers in 1901 for a paper he presented on the bridge construction.

The bridge has been designed for a train speed of 160 km per hour (99.41 miles per hour). Adequate steps have been taken to withstand quake.

See also
List of longest bridges in the world
List of longest bridges above water in India

References

External links

Mahanadi River
Railway bridges in India
Bridges in Odisha
Rail transport in Odisha
Bridges completed in 2008
2008 establishments in Orissa
Transport in Cuttack